Khandwa Naka is a sub-urb in the largest city and commercial hub Indore in the state of Madhya Pradesh, India.

History
Khandwa Naka has been home to the vast campus of Indore branch of Radha Soami Satsang Beas. It is also home to a slew of educational institutes, schools and colleges. The century-old Bilawali Lake is situated near Khandwa Naka.

Geography
The area consists of various residential colonies. It borders IT Park on the North-West, Tejaji Nagar on the Southern side.
Residential Colonies: Bhawna Nagar, Ekta Nagar, Ganesh Nagar, Krishnodaya Nagar, Kushwah Ji Ka Bagicha, Sant Nagar, Shri Yantra Nagar, Shri Vihar

Arterial Roads: Indore-Khandwa Road (MP SH 27)

Transport

Rail
The Indore Junction railway station is the nearest railway station. Public transport such as autos, taxis, magic-vans, city buses are readily available.

Bus
Khandwa Naka being located on the arterial Indore-Khandwa Road (National Highway 347BG (India)), several City Bus routes serve the area.
The bus routes passing by the main Khandwa Naka Square (also known as Radha Swami) are:

Political
Bhanwarkuan area falls under the Rau Assembly Constituency in Indore District. The current elected Member is Jitu Patwari from the Congress.

Education
Khandwa Naka area has an array of educational institutions starting from Nursery to Colleges.
It has CBSE as well as MP Board affiliated schools namely NDPS, a school of Indore.
Holy Cross School, Gurunanak Public School, Guru Harkishan School, Vedant Pre-School and Queens' College.

MRSC, a reputed college and  IET-DAVV, the institute of Engineering and Technology and Arihant College.

Places of Interest
 Bilawali Lake: A tourism spot
Radha Soami Satsang Beas, Indore 
 Holy Spirit Convent 
 Swami Narayan Temple 
 Gurudwara Shri Guru Harkishan Saheb Ji

References

External links
 City portal at Govt. of India info. website
 

Suburbs of Indore
Neighbourhoods in Indore